The 1933 Brown Bears football team represented Brown University as an independent during the 1933 college football season. Led by eighth-year head coach Tuss McLaughry, the Bears compiled a record of 3–5.

Schedule

References

Brown
Brown Bears football seasons
Brown Bears football